Middle Income Group Ground is a cricket ground in Bandra, Mumbai. The ground was host of the Women's World Cups in 1997 and 2013.

Overview
In 1997, the ground hosted a match between the Australia and Danish women's team. The match came into the limelight when Belinda Clark scored the first double century in international ODI cricket and the highest in Women's ODI cricket. She scored unbeaten 229 off 155 with 22 boundaries. The match was won by Australia Women's Cricket Team by 369 runs.

In 2013, the hosted two matches between Sri Lanka Women and West Indies and then Australia and West Indies. The ground also hosted two warm-up match.

References
Cricinfo profile
Middle Income Group Ground at CricketArchive
Women's One-Day International Matches played on Middle Income Group Ground at CricketArchive

Sports venues in Mumbai
Cricket grounds in Maharashtra
Sports venues completed in 1996
1996 establishments in Maharashtra
20th-century architecture in India